This is a list of those men who were made Knights Companion of the Order of the Bath from the date of the Order's revival by King George I of Great Britain, 18 May 1725, to its reorganisation on 2 January 1815. During this period the Order was limited to the Sovereign (the King), the Great Master and thirty-six Knights Companions. Knights Companion bore the post-nominal KB. Those Knights living at the time of the remodelling of the Order automatically became Knights Grand Cross, with the post-nominal GCB.

Founder Knights

All the founder knights were invested on 27 May 1725 (except Lords Inchiquin and Tyrconnell, who were invested on 28 May, and the Duke of Richmond, who was not invested at all) and then installed on 17 June 1725.

Subsequent appointments

References

Sources
 William A. Shaw and G. D. Burtchaell, The Knights of England, volume I (London, 1906) pages 167-179

Order of the Bath
Bath